The Bhaktardoba Model Hospital is a Government of Assam Hospital in Bhaktardoba,  Barpeta, Assam. that provides treatment to the people of Bhaktardoba as well as people from different parts of Barpeta district.

History 
8-12-2010 - Hon'ble Minister of Health and Family Welfare, Assam Dr. Himanta Biswa Sarma (Current Chief minister), MLA Tara Prasad Das and Barpeta District Commissioner Shri Phanidhar Kalita laid the foundation stone of Bhaktardoba Model Hospital building.

27-07-2018 -  Hon'ble Minister of State for Health and Family Welfare, Assam, Shri Pijush Hazarika inaugurated Bhaktardara Model Hospital in the presence of Hon'ble MLA, Sarukhetri Constituency, Shri Jakir Hussain Sikdar and Hon'ble Commissioner, Barpeta District, Shri Thaneswar Malakar.

Departments 
Dentistry
 ENT
Medicine
Obstetrics and Gynaecology
Paediatrics

References 

Hospitals in Assam